PF-184563 is a potent, selective non-peptidic antagonist of the V1a receptor. The compound was discovered by Pfizer in its Sandwich, Kent research center, as a potential treatment for dysmenorrhoea, an indication for which V1a antagonists have shown efficacy.

References

Pfizer brands
Vasopressin receptor antagonists